At least three ships of the Hellenic Navy have borne the name Doxa ("Glory"):

  a  launched in 1906 and sunk in 1917.
  a  launched in 1940 as USS Ludlow she was transferred to Greece in 1951 and renamed. She was scrapped in 1972.
  a  commissioned in the German Navy in 1962 as Najade she was transferred to Greece in 1991 and renamed. She was decommissioned in 2010.

Hellenic Navy ship names